In Ukraine, the title chief (head) of local (regional) state administration (Ukrainian: Голова місцевої державної адміністрації) refers to the chief executive of each of the administrative divisions of Ukraine: region (includes autonomous republic, oblasts), raion (district) or city, in case of Kyiv and Sevastopol. 

Informally the position of the head of regional state administration or more commonly oblast state administration (for oblasts) is referred to as governor. However, its function is very different from a traditional gubernatorial position.

The heads of local state administrations are appointed and dismissed by the President of Ukraine on the submission of the Cabinet of Ministers of Ukraine for the term of office of the head of the state.

Origin and overview
The position derived from the institute of presidential representatives that was introduced during the presidency of Leonid Kravchuk in 1992. After the resignation of Leonid Kravchuk as the President of Ukraine in 1993, most of presidential representatives positions in regions were discontinued and their functions were performed by chairmen of executive committee in each regional council. In the Autonomous Republic of Crimea, which during dissolution of the Soviet Union was transformed from Crimean Oblast to Crimean ASSR, also changed its regional (oblast) executive committee into Council of Ministers of the Crimean ASSR. The chief of Crimean regional executive committee became the chairman of the Council of Ministers of the Crimean ASSR. Introduction of the institute of presidential representatives in Crimea in early 1990s was blocked due to situation in Crimea when the Russian Federation failed to take full control over the peninsula.

Earlier before fall of the Soviet Union, chairmen of executive committee, that existed since the establishment of the Soviet regime in Ukraine, were completely overshadowed by the first secretaries and party offices of regional committees of the Communist Party of Ukraine which was a constituent part of the Communist Party of the Soviet Union due to the leading role of the Party in the Soviet Union. Previously, there existed chairman of executive committee (ispolkom) at governorate (province) level, raion (district) level, okruha (district) level, and oblast (province) level.

Beside the local state administration all local (regional, district, city) councils have their own executive committees.

There are two offices of a head of city-state administration one for Kyiv and another for Sevastopol. The head of Kyiv City State Administration (governor) usually is served by the Kyiv city mayor elected by the popular vote. The head of Sevastopol City State Administration (governor) is appointed by the president on petition of the prime minister. Sevastopol is the only city in Ukraine that does not have a mayoral position.

Due to the 2014 annexation of Crimea by the Russian Federation the post of the head of Sevastopol City State Administration is currently suspended, while the Presidential representative in Crimea continues to function in the continental Ukraine along with other Crimean office of executive power.

Appointment and termination
The chiefs of local state administrations are appointed by the President of Ukraine with the recommendation from the Prime Minister of Ukraine. The role and powers of the position are defined in the Chapter 2 (Articles 8 - 12) of the Law of Ukraine "On Local State Administration" (Law № 586-XIV, parliament, April 9, 1999). Candidates on the position of the chief of district state administration are recommended to the Prime Minister of Ukraine by the chiefs of the respected regional state administrations. 

The appointment is terminated in case of violation of the Constitution of Ukraine and laws of Ukraine, loss of citizenship or discovery of dual citizenship, recognition of incompetency by a court, emigration for a residence abroad, gaining a court conviction by a legal force, violation of compatibility requirements, declaring no confidence by the two-thirds of the relevant council composition, filing a request for dismissal from office at own will. The appointment may also be terminated by the President of Ukraine in case of accepting the resignation of the Chief of Regional State Administration, petition of Prime Minister of Ukraine on the grounds prescribed by the legislation about the State Service, declaring no confidence by the majority of the relevant council composition, other circumstances foreseen by this or other laws of Ukraine, on initiative of the President of Ukraine.  According to Article 118 of the Constitution of Ukraine, the heads  of the local administrations are appointed and dismissed by the President of Ukraine on the proposal of the Cabinet of Ministers.  According to the Ukrainian Constitution they should also resign after a new President is elected. 

The authority of the chiefs of local state administrations is terminated also upon their death. In case of election of the new President of Ukraine the chiefs of local state administrations continue to exercise their powers until appointment of the new chiefs of local state administrations in established order.

Role and powers
The chief thus heads the executive branch in each region, district, or city. The chief forms the composition of the local State Administration as well as its structure depending upon the budget allocations and requirements to the Article XVIII of the Law of Ukraine "On the Principles of Regulatory Policy in Economic Activity" (Law № 1160-IV, parliament, September 11, 2003).

To execute the Constitution of Ukraine, laws of Ukraine, acts of the President of Ukraine, Cabinet of Ukraine, other bodies of executive power as well as own and delegated powers the chief issues orders. The orders of the chief adopted within his/her competence are mandatory for execution on respective territory by all authorities, companies, institutions and organizations, officials and citizens.

Notable heads of RSA
 Viktor Yanukovych, governor of Donetsk Oblast who later served as the Prime Minister of Ukraine and the President of Ukraine
 Pavlo Lazarenko, governor of Dnipropetrovsk Oblast who later served as the Prime Minister of Ukraine 
 Yuriy Yekhanurov, governor of Dnipropetrovsk Oblast who later served as the Prime Minister of Ukraine
 Mikheil Saakashvili, former President of Georgia who later served as the governor of Odesa Oblast

List of governors who also served as government ministers: Serhiy Tulub, Mykhailo Kaskevych, Heorhiy Filipchuk, Mykola Derkach, Volodymyr Yatsuba, Viktor Bondar, Oleksandr Vilkul, Dmytro Kolyesnikov, Serhiy Polyakov, Anatoliy Blyznyuk, others.

List of governors who also served as governors in several regions: Volodymyr Shcherban, Mykola Lavryk, Volodymyr Kulish, Volodymyr Yatsuba, Valentyn Reznichenko, Pavlo Zhebrivskyi, others.

List of governors
 Governor of Cherkasy Oblast
 Governor of Chernihiv Oblast
 Governor of Chernivtsi Oblast
 Governor of Dnipropetrovsk Oblast
 Governor of Donetsk Oblast
 Governor of Ivano-Frankivsk Oblast
 Governor of Kharkiv Oblast
 Governor of Kherson Oblast
 Governor of Khmelnytskyi Oblast
 Governor of Kyiv Oblast
 Governor of Kirovohrad Oblast
 Governor of Luhansk Oblast
 Governor of Lviv Oblast
 Governor of Mykolaiv Oblast
 Governor of Odessa Oblast
 Governor of Poltava Oblast
 Governor of Rivne Oblast
 Governor of Sumy Oblast
 Governor of Ternopil Oblast
 Governor of Vinnytsia Oblast
 Governor of Volyn Oblast
 Governor of Zakarpattia Oblast
 Governor of Zaporizhia Oblast
 Governor of Zhytomyr Oblast
 Governor of Sevastopol, temporarily abolished
 Governor of Kyiv, often served by Mayor of Kyiv (for more information, see Kyiv City State Administration)
 Representatives of the President of Ukraine in Crimea
Prime Minister of Crimea, temporarily abolished

See also
 Governor
 Administrative divisions of Ukraine

References

External links

Government occupations
Gubernatorial titles